My Darling Clementine is a 1946 American Western film directed by John Ford and starring Henry Fonda as Wyatt Earp during the period leading up to the gunfight at the O.K. Corral. The ensemble cast also features Victor Mature (as Doc Holliday), Linda Darnell, Walter Brennan, Tim Holt, Cathy Downs and Ward Bond.

The title of the movie is borrowed from the theme song "Oh My Darling, Clementine", sung in parts over the opening and closing credits. The screenplay is based on the fictionalized biography Wyatt Earp: Frontier Marshal by Stuart Lake, as were two earlier movies, both named Frontier Marshal (released in 1934 and 1939, respectively).

My Darling Clementine is regarded by many film critics as one of the best Westerns ever made. In 1991, the film was deemed "culturally, historically, or aesthetically significant" by the Library of Congress and selected for preservation in the United States National Film Registry; it was among the first 75 films entered into the registry.

Plot 
In 1882 (a year after the actual gunfight at the O.K. Corral on October 26, 1881), Wyatt, Morgan, Virgil, and James Earp are driving cattle to California when they encounter Old Man Clanton and his sons. Clanton offers to buy their herd, but they curtly refuse to sell. When the Earps learn about the nearby boom town of Tombstone, the older brothers ride in, leaving the youngest, James, as watchman. The threesome soon learns that Tombstone is a lawless town without a marshal. Wyatt proves the only man in the town willing to face a drunken Indian shooting at the townspeople. When the brothers return to their camp, they find their cattle rustled and James murdered.

Wyatt returns to Tombstone. Seeking to avenge James's murder, he takes the open position of town marshal and encounters the hot-tempered Doc Holliday and scurrilous Clanton gang several times. During this time, Clementine Carter, Doc's former love interest from his hometown of Boston, arrives after a long search for her beau. She is given a room at the same hotel where both Wyatt and Doc Holliday reside.

Chihuahua, a hot-tempered Latina love interest of Doc's, sings in the local saloon. She runs afoul of Wyatt trying to tip a professional gambler off to his poker hand, resulting in Wyatt dunking her in a horse trough. Doc, who is suffering badly from tuberculosis and fled from Clementine previously, is unhappy with her arrival; he tells her to return to Boston or he will leave Tombstone. Clementine stays, so Doc leaves for Tucson. Wyatt, who has been taken by Clementine since her arrival, begins to awkwardly court her. Angry over Doc's hasty flight Chihuahua starts an argument with Clementine. Wyatt walks in on their spat and breaks it up. He notices Chihuahua is wearing a silver cross that had been taken from his brother James the night he'd been killed. She claims Doc gave it to her.

Wyatt chases down Doc, with whom he has had a testy relationship. Doc forces a shoot-out, ending with Wyatt shooting a pistol out of Doc's hand. The two return to Tombstone, where after being questioned, Chihuahua reveals the silver cross was actually given to her by Billy Clanton. During the interrogation Billy shoots Chihuahua through a window and takes off on horseback, but is wounded by Wyatt. Wyatt directs his brother Virgil to pursue him. The chase leads to the Clanton homestead, where Billy dies of his wounds. Old Man Clanton then shoots Virgil in the back in cold blood.

In town, a reluctant Doc is persuaded to operate on Chihuahua. Hope swells for her successful recovery. The Clantons then arrive, toss Virgil's body on the street and announce they will be waiting for the rest of the Earps at the O.K. Corral.

Chihuahua dies and Doc decides to join the Earps, walking alongside Wyatt and Morgan to the corral at sunup. A gunfight ensues in which most of the Clantons are killed, as is Doc.

Wyatt and Morgan resign as law enforcers. Morgan heads West in a horse and buggy. Wyatt bids Clementine farewell at the school house, wistfully promising that if he ever returns he will look her up. Mounting his horse, he muses aloud, "Ma'am, I sure like that name...Clementine," and rides off to join his brother.

Cast

Production

Development
In 1931, Stuart Lake published the first biography two years after Earp's death. Lake retold the story in the 1946 book My Darling Clementine, for which Ford acquired the film rights. The two books have since been determined to be largely fictionalized stories about the Earp brothers and the gunfight at the O.K. Corral and their conflict with the outlaw Cowboys: Billy Clanton, Tom McLaury and his brother Frank McLaury. The gunfight was relatively unknown to the American public until Lake published the two books and after the movie was made.

Director John Ford said that when he was a prop boy in the early days of silent pictures, Earp would visit pals he knew from his Tombstone days on the sets. "I used to give him a chair and a cup of coffee, and he told me about the fight at the O.K. Corral. So in My Darling Clementine, we did it exactly the way it had been." Ford did not want to make the movie, but his contract required him to make one more movie for 20th Century Fox.

In their later years, Wyatt and Josephine Earp worked hard to eliminate any mention of Josephine's previous relationship with Johnny Behan or Wyatt's previous common law marriage to Matty Blaylock. They successfully kept Josephine's name out of Lake's biography of Wyatt and after he died, Josephine threatened to sue the movie producers to keep it that way. Lake corresponded with Josephine, and he claimed she attempted to influence what he wrote and hamper him in every way possible, including consulting lawyers. Josephine insisted she was striving to protect Wyatt Earp's legacy.

After the movie Gunfight at the O.K. Corral (in which John Ireland portrayed another real-life figure of the time, Johnny Ringo) was released in 1957, the shootout came to be known by that name.

Writing
The final script of the movie varies considerably from historical fact to create additional dramatic conflict and character. Clementine Carter is not a historical person, and in this script appears to be an amalgam of Big Nose Kate and Josephine Earp. Unlike the movie characters, the Earps were never cowboys, drovers, or cattle owners. Important plot devices in the film and personal details about the main characters were all liberally adapted for the movie.

Old Man Clanton actually died prior to the gunfight and probably never met any of the Earps. Doc was a dentist, not a surgeon, and survived the shootout. James Earp, who was portrayed as the youngest brother and the first to die in the story, actually was the eldest brother and lived until 1926. The key women in Wyatt's and Doc's lives—Wyatt's common law wife Josephine and Doc's common-law wife Big Nose Kate—were not present in Lake's original story and were kept out of the movie as well. The film gives the date of the gunfight as 1882 although it actually occurred in 1881.

Upon leaving Tombstone, the itinerant actor, Granville Thorndyke (Alan Mowbray), bids farewell to the old soldier, "Dad" (Francis Ford, John Ford's elder brother), with lines from Joseph Addison's poem, "The Campaign": "Great Souls by Instinct to each other turn,/Demand Alliance ("allegiance" in the film), and in Friendship burn..."

Filming
Much of the film was shot in Monument Valley, a scenic desert region straddling the Arizona-Utah border used in other John Ford movies. It is 500 miles (800 km) away from the town of Tombstone in southern Arizona. After seeing a preview screening of the film, 20th Century Fox studio boss Darryl F. Zanuck felt Ford's original cut was too long and had some weak spots, so he had Lloyd Bacon shoot new footage and heavily edit the film. Zanuck had Bacon cut 30 minutes from the film.

While Ford's original cut of the film has not survived, a "pre-release" cut dating from a few months after the preview screening was discovered in the UCLA film archives; this version preserves some additional footage as well as alternative scoring and editing. UCLA film preservationist Robert Gitt edited a version of the film that incorporates some of the earlier version. Perhaps the most significant change is the film's ending; in Ford's original version, Earp awkwardly shakes hands with Clementine Carter. In the version released in 1946, Earp kisses her on the cheek.

Critical reception 
The film is generally regarded as one of the best Westerns made by John Ford and one of his best films overall. The review aggregator website Rotten Tomatoes reported a 100% approval rating with an average score of 8.79/10, based on 30 reviews.

At the time of its release, Bosley Crowther lauded the film and wrote, "The eminent director, John Ford, is a man who has a way with a Western like nobody in the picture trade. Seven years ago his classic Stagecoach snuggled very close to fine art in this genre. And now, by George, he's almost matched it with My Darling Clementine ... But even with standard Western fiction—and that's what the script has enjoined—Mr. Ford can evoke fine sensations and curiously-captivating moods. From the moment that Wyatt and his brothers are discovered on the wide and dusty range, trailing a herd of cattle to a far-off promised land, a tone of pictorial authority is struck—and it is held. Every scene, every shot is the product of a keen and sensitive eye—an eye which has deep comprehension of the beauty of rugged people and a rugged world." The Variety reviewer wrote, "Trademark of John Ford's direction is clearly stamped on the film with its shadowy lights, softly contrasted moods and measured pace, but a tendency is discernible towards stylization for the sake of stylization. At several points, the pic comes to a dead stop to let Ford go gunning for some arty effect".

Director Sam Peckinpah considered My Darling Clementine his favorite Western, and paid homage to it in several of his Westerns, including Major Dundee (1965) and The Wild Bunch (1969). Similarly, director Hayao Miyazaki called it one of his ten favorite movies.

Fifty years after its release, Roger Ebert reviewed the film and included it in his list of The Great Movies. He wrote it was "one of the sweetest and most good-hearted of all Westerns", unusual in making the romance between Earp and Clementine the heart of the film rather than the gunfight.

In 2004, Matt Bailey summarized its significance: "If there is one film that deserves every word of praise ever uttered or written about it, it is John Ford's My Darling Clementine. Perhaps the greatest film in a career full of great films, arguably the finest achievement in a rich and magnificent genre, and undoubtedly the best version of one of America's most enduring myths, the film is an undeniable and genuine classic." In the British Film Institute's 2012 Sight & Sound polls, seven critics and five directors named it one of their 10 favorite films.

In 2012, director Michael Mann named My Darling Clementine one of his ten favorite films, stating it was "possibly the finest drama in the western genre" and "achieves near-perfection" in its cinematography and editing. It was also President Harry Truman's favorite film.

The Japanese filmmaker Akira Kurosawa cited My Darling Clementine as one of his 100 favorite films.

References

External links 

 
 
 
 
 My Darling Clementine: The Great Beyond an essay by David Jenkins at the Criterion Collection

1946 films
1946 Western (genre) films
20th Century Fox films
American Western (genre) films
American black-and-white films
Cultural depictions of Doc Holliday
Cultural depictions of Wyatt Earp
Films about brothers
Films about tuberculosis
Films based on biographies
Films directed by John Ford
Films scored by Cyril J. Mockridge
Films set in 1882
Films set in Tombstone, Arizona
Films shot in Utah
Films shot in Arizona
United States National Film Registry films
1940s English-language films
1940s American films
Films shot in Monument Valley